The Cadiz Railroad was a shortline railroad originating in Cadiz, Kentucky. Incorporated in 1901, it ran to a connection with the Illinois Central Railroad at Gracey, Kentucky, a distance of ten miles. The line started service in 1902. In 1984, it obtained an additional 18 miles with the purchase of the Illinois Central line from Gracey to Princeton, Kentucky.

The Railroad ran with steam locomotives until July 25th, 1954 when 0-6-0 #205 took a historical society chartered train. After that, locomotives in the later years were two Alco S1 660 Horsepower, Nos. 8 and 9, and Alco S3 No. 10, also 660 HP.  Loco No. 8 had its engine removed and is being used today as a display on the old roadbed at Cadiz.

The railroad hauled lumber, furniture, farm chemicals, and scrap, but was originally built to haul tobacco to market.

The line was abandoned in 1985 and its rails were removed.

In later years, at least 2.5 miles of the old Cadiz Railroad - from Jefferson Street to Fortner Drive - were converted to a walking/running/biking trail. It runs between an old railroad depot on Ky. 139 and Fortner Drive at the east end of town. The trail parallels Noel Drive and Lafayette Street, following an old corridor of the Cadiz Railroad.

References

Defunct Kentucky railroads
Transportation in Trigg County, Kentucky
Transportation in Caldwell County, Kentucky
Rail trails in Kentucky
Transportation in Christian County, Kentucky
Railway companies disestablished in 1985
Railway companies established in 1901
1901 establishments in Kentucky
1985 disestablishments in Kentucky
Railroad